"Clouds" is a song by English singer-songwriter and musician Newton Faulkner from his third studio album Write It On Your Skin (2012). The song was released on 29 June 2012 in the UK as the second single from the album. The song peaked to number 68 on the UK Singles Chart. The song was written by Sam Farrar, Newton Faulkner and Toby Faulkner.

Track listing
Digital download
 "Clouds" - 3:17
 "Crocodile Smile" - 2:50

Credits and personnel
Lead vocals – Newton Faulkner
Producers – Sam Farrar, Newton Faulkner, Mike Spencer
Lyrics – Sam Farrar, Newton Faulkner, Toby Faulkner
Label: RCA Records

Chart performance

Release history

References

2012 singles
Newton Faulkner songs
Songs written by Newton Faulkner
2012 songs
Songs written by Sam Farrar
RCA Records singles